The 1997 Giro del Trentino was the 21st edition of the Tour of the Alps cycle race and was held on 28 April to 1 May 1997. The race started in Riva del Garda and finished in Lienz. The race was won by Luc Leblanc.

General classification

References

1997
1997 in road cycling
1997 in Italian sport